Verrucous cysts  are a cutaneous condition that resemble epidermoid cysts except that the lining demonstrates papillomatosis.

See also 
 Milia
 Skin lesion

References 

Epidermal nevi, neoplasms, and cysts